Peter Cheung Chak-yau (born 1952) is a Hong Kong judge. He has served as a Justice of Appeal of the Court of Appeal since July 2001.

Education
Cheung was educated at St Joseph's College in Hong Kong. He graduated from the University of Hong Kong with an LLB in 1975. He obtained an LLM from the University of London in 1977.

Legal and judicial career
Cheung was called to the Bar at Lincoln's Inn in England in 1976. He was called to the Hong Kong Bar in 1977. He was a barrister in private practice in Hong Kong.

In 1990, Cheung sat as a Deputy District Judge. He was appointed a full-time District Judge in 1991.

In 1994, Cheung was appointed as a High Court Judge.

On 23 July 2001, Cheung was elevated to the Court of Appeal.

References

Living people
1952 births
Alumni of the University of Hong Kong
Hong Kong judges
Barristers of Hong Kong